The Parliamentary Under-Secretary of State for Defence People, Veterans and Service Families is a ministerial position in the Ministry of Defence in the British government, currently held by Andrew Murrison who took the office on 30 October 2022.

Responsibilities 
The minister has the following ministerial responsibilities:

civilian and service personnel policy
armed forces pay, pensions and compensation
Armed Forces Covenant
welfare and service families
community engagement
equality, diversity and inclusion
mental health
Defence Medical Services
the people programme (Flexible Engagement Strategy, Future Accommodation Model and Enterprise Approach)
estates service family accommodation policy and engagement with welfare

List of ministers

References

 
Military of the United Kingdom